Roberto Cuevas Martín (born 30 January 1981 in Abadiño, Biscay) is a Spanish footballer who plays as a forward.

External links

1981 births
Living people
People from Abadiño
Spanish footballers
Footballers from the Basque Country (autonomous community)
Association football forwards
Segunda División players
Segunda División B players
Tercera División players
CD Basconia footballers
Bilbao Athletic footballers
SD Eibar footballers
Ciudad de Murcia footballers
Mérida UD footballers
Deportivo Alavés players
SD Amorebieta footballers
Athletic Bilbao footballers
Sportspeople from Biscay